The 2022 KML Play-offs was the tournament to determine the Korvpalli Meistriliiga champions for the 2021–22 season. Regular season was spent in the Estonian-Latvian Basketball League, plus 1 round in the local league, before determining seeding for the play-offs. 7 of 8 teams that participated in the regular season qualified for the play-offs, which started with the quarterfinals. The play-offs began on 26 April 2022 and ended on 26 May. Pärnu Sadam won their first ever title.

Format 
Eight Estonian teams participated in the regular season, which was spent in two parts. First, all teams played in the Latvian-Estonian Basketball League and after played one more round only against Estonian teams. 7 out of 8 teams qualified for the play-offs. Winner of the regular season immediately qualified for the semi-finals, while teams that finished the regular season 2nd to 7th place started the play-offs with quarterfinals. Winners of all play-off rounds are determined in the series of best-of-five format.

Teams

Venues and locations

Personnel and kits

Seeding

Play-off bracket

Quarter-finals

|}

Semi-finals 

|}

Kalev/Cramo vs. Pärnu Sadam

TalTech/Optibet vs. Tartu Ülikool Maks & Moorits

Bronze medal serie 

|}

Final 

|}

See also
2021–22 KML season

References

Korvpalli Meistriliiga playoffs
2021–22 in Estonian basketball